Habash (also Romanized as Ḩabash; also known as Sarcheshmeh and Ḩabash Sarcheshmeh) is a village in Nazarkahrizi Rural District, Nazarkahrizi District, Hashtrud County, East Azerbaijan Province, Iran. At the 2006 census, its population was 82, in 13 families.

References 

Towns and villages in Hashtrud County